Events from the year 1899 in Canada.

Incumbents

Crown 
 Monarch – Victoria

Federal government 
 Governor General – The 4th Earl of Minto
 Prime Minister – Wilfrid Laurier
 Chief Justice – Samuel Henry Strong (Ontario)
 Parliament – 8th

Provincial governments

Lieutenant governors 
Lieutenant Governor of British Columbia – Thomas Robert McInnes
Lieutenant Governor of Manitoba – James Colebrooke Patterson
Lieutenant Governor of New Brunswick – Jabez Bunting Snowball 
Lieutenant Governor of Nova Scotia – Malachy Bowes Daly  
Lieutenant Governor of Ontario – Oliver Mowat 
Lieutenant Governor of Prince Edward Island – George W. Howlan (until May 23) then Peter Adolphus McIntyre 
Lieutenant Governor of Quebec – Louis-Amable Jetté

Premiers 
Premier of British Columbia – Charles Augustus Semlin 
Premier of Manitoba – Thomas Greenway 
Premier of New Brunswick – Henry Emmerson 
Premier of Nova Scotia – George Henry Murray 
Premier of Ontario – Arthur Sturgis Hardy (until October 21) then George William Ross  
Premier of Prince Edward Island – Donald Farquharson 
Premier of Quebec – Félix-Gabriel Marchand

Territorial governments

Commissioners 
 Commissioner of Yukon – William Ogilvie

Lieutenant governors 
 Lieutenant Governor of Keewatin – James Colebrooke Patterson
 Lieutenant Governor of the North-West Territories – Amédée E. Forget

Premiers 
 Premier of North-West Territories – Frederick Haultain

Events
January 20 – About 2000 Doukhobors arrive in Halifax, Nova Scotia, 7400 by year end. 
June 21 – Treaty No. 8 cedes much of northern Alberta to the Crown
July 5 – Brandon, Manitoba housemaid Hilda Blake shoots her mistress twice; the first shot misses, but the second bullet pierces the mistress's right lung. Blake was later hanged for murder.
September 18 – The new City Hall building opens in Toronto.
September 19 – A rock slide in Quebec City kills 45
October 4 – First Canadian troops sent to an overseas war (Boer War)
October 18 – Henri Bourassa resigns from cabinet to protest Canada's intervention in the Boer War
October 21 – George William Ross becomes premier of Ontario, replacing Arthur S. Hardy
October 30 – Second Boer War: The first Canadian troops arrive in the Cape Colony

Arts and literature

Births

January to June
January 5 – Hugh John Flemming, politician and 24th Premier of New Brunswick (d.1982)
January 6 – Sonia Eckhardt-Gramatté, composer
February 27 – Charles Best, medical scientist, co-discoverer of insulin (d.1978)
March 14 – K. C. Irving, entrepreneur and industrialist (d.1992)
May 26 – Antonio Barrette, politician and 18th Premier of Quebec (d.1968)
May 27 – Dov Yosef, Canadian-born Israeli politician and statesman (d.1980)

July to December
July 24 – Dan George, actor and author (d.1981)
August 1 – F. R. Scott, poet, intellectual and constitutional expert (d.1985)
October 2 – Juda Hirsch Quastel, biochemist (d.1987)
October 3 – Adrien Arcand, journalist and fascist (d.1967)
November 5 – Gilbert Layton, businessman and politician (d.1961)
November 10 – Billy Boucher, ice hockey player (d.1958)
November 17 – Douglas Shearer, sound designer and recording director (d.1971)
November 30 – Edna Diefenbaker, first wife of Prime Minister John Diefenbaker (d.1951)
December 24 – William Van Steenburgh, scientist

Deaths
February 10 – Archibald Lampman, poet (b.1861)
April 29 – George Frederick Baird, politician and lawyer (b.1851)
July 31 – James David Edgar, politician (b.1841)
August 29 – Catharine Parr Traill, writer (b.1802) 
October 25 
 Grant Allen, science writer, author and novelist (b.1848)
 Peter Mitchell, politician, Minister and a Father of Confederation (b.1824)
November 19 – John William Dawson, geologist and university administrator (b.1820)
December 13 
 George Airey Kirkpatrick, politician (b.1841)
 Lucius Richard O'Brien, painter (b.1832)

Historical documents
Missionary persuades Cree leader Yellow Bear to burn his "heathen idols" at Shoal Lake in Saskatchewan (Note: "bad spirit" and other stereotypes)

Southern Tutchone man describes transfer of reindeer to Yukon from Alaska

Official describes Indigenous and Metis people at Treaty 8 signing (Note: "wild men" and other stereotypes)

Old woman in Fort Erie, Ontario tells of escaping slavery in Virginia with her parents and six siblings

Mackenzie King realizes his parliamentary vocation at Westminster in London

Oozing tar and leaking gas on Athabasca River near Fort McMurray

Article on gold strike in northern Ontario

Nurse treats feisty patients under horrible conditions in Dawson City's hospital

Murals provided to new Toronto City Hall to encourage development of wall decoration

Edison film of Whitehorse Rapids, Yukon River

References 

 
Years of the 19th century in Canada